New Haven County is a county in the south central part of the U.S. state of Connecticut. As of the 2020 census, the population was 864,835, making it the third-most populous county in Connecticut. Two of the state's top 5 largest cities, New Haven (3rd) and Waterbury (5th), are part of New Haven County.

New Haven County is part of the New Haven-Milford, CT Metropolitan Statistical Area, which is included in the New York metropolitan Combined Statistical Area.

County governments were abolished in Connecticut in 1960. Thus, as is the case with all eight of Connecticut's counties, there is no county government, and no county seat. Until 1960, the city of New Haven was the county seat. In Connecticut, towns are responsible for all local government activities, including fire and rescue, snow removal and schools. In some cases, neighboring towns will share certain activities, e.g. schools, health, etc.  New Haven County is merely a group of towns on a map, and has no specific government authority. The county Sheriff system was abolished by voters and replaced by State Judicial Marshals in 2000. As a result, the state judicial system in New Haven County has three judicial districts: New Haven, Ansonia-Milford, and Waterbury.

History
Following the process of unification of New Haven Colony with Connecticut Colony in 1664–65, cohesion could be improved. New Haven County was constituted by an act of the Connecticut General Court on May 10, 1666, along with Hartford County, Fairfield County, and New London County. The act establishing the county states:
This Court orders that from the east bounds of Guilford
vnto ye west bounds of Milford shalbe for future one County
wch shalbe called the County of N: Hauen. And it is
ordered that the County Court shalbe held at N: Hauen on
the second Wednesday in March and on the second Wednesday
in Nouember yearely.

As established in 1666, New Haven County consisted of the towns of Milford, New Haven, and Guilford. The town of Wallingford was established in 1670 in unincorporated area north of New Haven and formally added to New Haven County in 1671. In 1675, the town of Derby was established north of Milford. In 1686, the town of Waterbury was established, but was assigned as part of Hartford County. Waterbury was transferred to New Haven County in 1728. In 1722, most of northwestern Connecticut (except for the town of Litchfield) was placed under the jurisdiction of New Haven County. Eight years later, in 1730, the eastern half of northwestern Connecticut was transferred to the jurisdiction of Hartford County. By mid-1738, with the exception of the towns of New Milford, Sharon, and Salisbury, the entire territory of northwestern Connecticut was under Hartford County. In 1751, Litchfield County was constituted consisting of all the towns in northwestern Connecticut. Between 1780 and 1807, several more towns were established along the northern boundary of New Haven County, resulting in the alteration of the limits of the county. The final boundary alteration leading to the modern boundary resulted from the establishment of the town of Middlebury on October 8, 1807.

Geography
It is the second-largest county in Connecticut by total area.

Features
The terrain is mostly flat near the coast, with low hills defining the rest of the area, rising significantly only in the north of the county. The highest elevation is close to the northernmost point in the county, found at two areas of approximately 1,050 feet (320 m) above sea level in the town of Wolcott. The lowest point is sea level.

Notable geographic landmarks include Mount Carmel ("Sleeping Giant"), West Rock and East Rock.

Adjacent counties
Hartford County (north)
Middlesex County (east)
Fairfield County (west)
Litchfield County (northwest)

New Haven county is bounded on the south by Long Island Sound.

National protected area
Stewart B. McKinney National Wildlife Refuge (part)

Government and municipal services
As of 1960, counties in Connecticut do not have any associated county government structure. All municipal services are provided by the towns. In order to address issues concerning more than one town, several regional agencies that help coordinate the towns for infrastructure, land use, and economic development concerns have been established. Within the geographical area of New Haven County, the regional agencies are:
South Central
Central Naugatuck Valley (partly in Litchfield County)
The Valley (partly in Fairfield County)

Judicial
The geographic area of the county is served by the three separate judicial districts: Ansonia-Milford, Waterbury, and New Haven. The Ansonia-Milford jurisdiction has two superior courthouses, one in Derby, the other in Milford. The Waterbury and New Haven judicial districts have superior courthouses located, respectively, in Waterbury, and New Haven.

Law enforcement
Law enforcement within the geographic area of the county is provided by the respective town police departments. Prior to 2000, a County Sheriff's Department existed for the purpose of executing judicial warrants, prisoner transport, and court security. These responsibilities have now been taken over by the Connecticut State Marshal System.

Fire protection
Fire protection in the county is provided by the towns. Several towns also have fire districts that provide services to a section of the town.

Founded in 1937, New Haven County has a county-wide fire-protection agency called "New Haven County Fire Emergency Plan" based in Hamden to "Coordinate Mutual Aid - Radio Problems, assist members of county at major incidents if requested, provide training".

Water service
Water service is provided by a regional non-profit public corporation known as the South Central Connecticut Regional Water Authority. The Regional Water Authority supplies water to most of the towns within New Haven County, excluding the Waterbury area and the towns of Guilford and Madison. The Regional Water Authority is one of only two such county-wide public water service providers in the state.

Politics
As with nearly all other Connecticut counties, New Haven County is a Democratic stronghold. The last Republican victory in New Haven County was George Bush in 1988. Since the 1990s, the county has trended increasingly Democratic.

|}

Transportation

Major Roads

Boston Post Road
U.S. 1 is the oldest east–west route in the county, running through all of its shoreline cities and towns.  Known by various names along its length, most commonly "Boston Post Road" or simply "Post Road", it gradually gains latitude from west to east.  Thus U.S. 1 west is officially designated "South" and east is "North".

Interstate 91
The start of Interstate 91 begins at the interchange in New Haven with I-95. It runs parallel to U.S. Route 5 as it heads towards Hartford and Vermont.

Interstate 95
The western portions of Interstate 95 in Connecticut are known as the Connecticut Turnpike or the Governor John Davis Lodge Turnpike in New Haven County and it crosses the state approximately parallel to U.S. Route 1. The road is most commonly referred to as "I-95". The highway is six lanes (sometimes eight lanes) throughout the county. It was completed in 1958 and is often clogged with traffic particularly during morning and evening rush hours.

With the cost of land so high along the Gold Coast, state lawmakers say they don't consider widening the highway to be fiscally feasible, although occasional stretches between entrances and nearby exits are now sometimes connected with a fourth "operational improvement" lane (for instance, westbound between the Exit 10 interchange in Darien and Exit 8 in Stamford). Expect similar added lanes in Darien and elsewhere in the Fairfield County portion of the highway in the future, lawmakers and state Department of Transportation officials say.

Wilbur Cross Parkway
The Wilbur Cross Parkway or Connecticut Route 15, is a truck-free scenic parkway that runs through the county parallel and generally several miles north of Interstate 95. It begins at the Igor I. Sikorsky Memorial Bridge and terminates at the Berlin turnpike. The parkway goes through Heroes Tunnel in New Haven.

The parkway is a National Scenic Byway and is listed on the National Register of Historic Places.

Interstate 84
Interstate 84, which runs through Danbury, is scheduled to be widened to a six-lane highway at all points between Danbury and Waterbury. State officials say they hope the widening will not only benefit drivers regularly on the route but also entice some cars from the more crowded Interstate 95, which is roughly parallel to it. Heavier trucks are unlikely to use Interstate 84 more often, however, because the route is much hillier than I-95 according to a state Department of Transportation official.

Demographics

2000 census
At the 2000 census, there were 824,008 people, 319,040 households, and 210,566 families residing in the county. The racial makeup of the county was 79.40% White, 11.32% Black or African American, 0.25% Native American, 2.33% Asian, 0.04% Pacific Islander, 4.51% from other races, and 2.16% from two or more races. 10.09% of the population were Hispanic or Latino of any race. 24.5% were of Italian, 12.3% Irish, 6.0% Polish, 5.7% English and 5.6% German ancestry according to Census 2000. 8.73% of the population reported speaking Spanish at home, while 2.05% speak Italian.

There were 319,040 households, of which 31.20% had children under the age of 18 living with them, 48.60% were married couples living together, 13.60% had a female householder with no husband present, and 34.00% were non-families. 28.20% of all households were made up of individuals, and 11.00% had someone living alone who was 65 years of age or older. The average household size was 2.50 and the average family size was 3.08.

The age distribution was 24.50% under the age of 18, 8.70% from 18 to 24, 30.00% from 25 to 44, 22.40% from 45 to 64, and 14.50% who were 65 years of age or older. The median age was 37 years. For every 100 females, there were 92.50 males.  For every 100 females age 18 and over, there were 88.70 males.

The median household income was $48,834, and the median family income was $60,549. Males had a median income of $43,643 versus $32,001 for females. The per capita income for the county was $24,439.  About 7.00% of families and 9.50% of the population were below the poverty line, including 13.00% of those under age 18 and 7.70% of those age 65 or over.

2010 census
As of the 2010 United States census, there were 862,477 people, 334,502 households, and 215,749 families residing in the county. The racial makeup of the county was 74.8% white, 12.7% black or African American, 3.5% Asian, 0.3% American Indian, 6.0% from other races, and 2.6% from two or more races. Those of Hispanic or Latino origin made up 15.0% of the population. In terms of ancestry, 24.0% were Italian, 17.5% were Irish, 9.3% were German, 8.5% were English, 7.6% were Polish, and 2.0% were American.

Of the 334,502 households, 31.7% had children under the age of 18 living with them, 45.5% were married couples living together, 14.5% had a female householder with no husband present, 35.5% were non-families, and 28.9% of all households were made up of individuals. The average household size was 2.49 and the average family size was 3.09. The median age was 39.3 years.

The median income for a household in the county was $61,114 and the median income for a family was $77,379. Males had a median income of $56,697 versus $43,941 for females. The per capita income for the county was $31,720. About 7.9% of families and 10.9% of the population were below the poverty line, including 15.7% of those under age 18 and 7.1% of those age 65 or over.

Demographic breakdown by town

The following income data is from the 2010 United States Census and the 2006-2010 American Community Survey 5-Year Estimates:

Metropolitan Statistical Area
The United States Office of Management and Budget has designated New Haven County as the New Haven-Milford, CT Metropolitan Statistical Area.  The United States Census Bureau ranked the New Haven-Milford, CT Metropolitan Statistical Area as the 62nd most populous metropolitan statistical area of the United States as of July 1, 2012.

The Office of Management and Budget has further designated the New Haven-Milford, CT Metropolitan Statistical Area as a component of the more extensive New York-Newark, NY-NJ-CT-PA Combined Statistical Area, the most populous combined statistical area and primary statistical area of the United States as of July 1, 2012.

Education

Primary and secondary education
Education in the county area is usually provided by the individual town governments. Several less populated towns have joined together to form regional school districts. Bethany, Orange, and Woodbridge are part of Region 5; Middlebury and Southbury are part of Region 15; and Beacon Falls and Prospect are part of Region 16.

School districts include:

K-12:

 Ansonia School District
 Branford School District
 Cheshire School District
 Derby School District
 East Haven School District
 Guilford School District
 Hamden School District
 Madison School District
 Meriden School District
 Milford School District
 Naugatuck School District
 New Haven School District
 North Branford School District
 North Haven School District
 Oxford School District
 Regional School District 15
 Regional School District 16
 Seymour School District
 Wallingford School District
 Waterbury School District
 West Haven School District
 Wolcott School District
 Woodbridge School District

Secondary districts:
 Regional High School District 05

Elementary districts:
 Bethany School District
 Orange School District

Tertiary education
New Haven county serves as a center of advanced learning, with several noted educational institutions located within its borders centered on the city of New Haven. These include:

Albertus Magnus College
Gateway Community College
Naugatuck Valley Community College
Paier College of Art
Post University
Quinnipiac University
Southern Connecticut State University
University of Connecticut
University of New Haven
Yale University

Communities

Cities

Ansonia
Derby
Meriden
Milford
Devon
Woodmont
New Haven
Amity
Cedar Hill
City Point
Downtown
East Rock
Fair Haven
Fair Haven Heights
Long Wharf
Mill River
Quinnipiac Meadows
Westville
Wooster Square
Waterbury
Brooklyn
Bunker Hill
Bucks Hill
Downtown Waterbury
East Mountain
Town Plot
Waterville
West Haven

Towns
Villages are named localities within towns but have no separate corporate existence from the towns they are in.

Beacon Falls
Bethany
Branford
Branford Center
Short Beach
Stony Creek
Cheshire
Cheshire Village
East Haven
Guilford
Guilford Center
Hamden
Madison
Madison Center
Middlebury
Naugatuck (consolidated with the borough of Naugatuck)
Union City
North Branford
Northford
Twin Lakes
North Haven
Orange
Oxford
Quaker Farms
Prospect
Seymour
Southbury
Heritage Village
South Britain
Southford
Wallingford
Wallingford Center
Yalesville
Wolcott
Woodtick
Woodbridge

See also

List of Registered Historic Places in New Haven County, Connecticut
Greater New Haven
National Register of Historic Places listings in New Haven County, Connecticut
New Haven County Cutters
Panthean temple

References

External links

New Haven County Marshals Association
 New Haven County Fire Emergency Plan
National Register of Historic Places listing for New Haven Co., Connecticut
New Haven County Bar Association

 

 
1666 establishments in Connecticut
1960 disestablishments in Connecticut
Counties in the New York metropolitan area
Populated places established in 1666